The Greater Windward skink  (Copeoglossum aurae) is a species of skink found in Grenada, St. Vincent, the Grenadines, and Trinidad and Tobago.

References

Copeoglossum
Reptiles described in 2012
Taxa named by Stephen Blair Hedges
Taxa named by Caitlin E. Conn
Lizards of the Caribbean